The 1904 Princeton Tigers football team represented Princeton University in the 1904 college football season. The team finished with an 8–2 record under second-year head coach Art Hillebrand and outscored its opponents by a total of 181 to 34. Princeton tackle James Cooney was selected as a consensus first-team honoree on the 1904 College Football All-America Team.

Schedule

References

Princeton
Princeton Tigers football seasons
Princeton Tigers football